Terminalia arbuscula, also called white olive, is a species of plant in the Combretaceae family. It is endemic to Jamaica.  It is threatened by habitat loss.

References

arbuscula
Endangered plants
Endemic flora of Jamaica
Taxonomy articles created by Polbot
Taxa named by Olof Swartz